Reilingen is a municipality in the district of Rhein-Neckar in Baden-Württemberg, Germany. It is located on Bertha Benz Memorial Route.

References

Rhein-Neckar-Kreis
Baden